Khaburis Codex (alternate spelling Khaboris, Khabouris) is a 10th century Classical Syriac manuscript which contain the complete Peshitta New Testament.

Colophon 
There have been claims that the earlier document's colophon identifies it as being a 'copy' rendered from a manuscript dating 164 AD, internally documented as 100 years after the great persecution of the Christians by Nero, in 64 AD – however the colophon is unreadable. To this day, there is no published transcription.

Provenance 

The Khaboris codex was obtained by Norman Malek-Yonan and attorney Dan MacDougald in 1966 for $25,000. It "was purchased from the library of an ancient Assyrian monastery atop one of the mountains of Assyria, near the River Habbor, or in Aramaic, Khabur, hence the name 'Khaburis'." It seems both men went overseas looking for a more intact Aramaic version of the New Testament following Malek-Yonan's experiences surrounding the Yonan Codex in the 1950s. Malek-Yonan's prior codex had been repaired with newer materials at some point in its history. He claimed the Yonan Codexb had been in his family since the 4th century. In his account of the controversial history surrounding the Yonan codexb, Christian Greek-primacist Bruce Metzger tells of dating it to the 7th century at its earliest.

The stories of the Yonan Codexa and the Khaboris Codexb are linked by the involvement of Dan MacDougald. On page 115 of the Society of Biblical Literature's reprint of The Saga of the Yonan Codex, Metzger tells of getting news of the Yonan Codex in the late 1970s. He writes,

"Curiously enough, several year [sic] later while I was attending sessions of the annual meeting of the American Academy of Religion, Dr. Paul L. Garber, professor of Bible at Agnes Scott College, Decatur, Georgia, casually inquired of me whether I had ever heard of the Yonan Codexa. This led to a most astonishing disclosure. A medieval copy (Khabourisb) of the manuscript, Garber told me, was in the possession of the Emotional Maturity Instruction Center, Decatur, Georgia. The center had transliterated the Syriac text of the Beatitudes in Christ's Sermon on the Mount (Matthew 5:3–12) and was making a copy of this available for four dollars with the assurance that, by concentrating each day on these sentences in Aramaic, one's personality would become adjusted and more mature. In fact, according to Garber the center had even persuaded magistrates in Atlanta to buy copies of the transliteration for use in attempting to quell obstreperous prisoners!"

A Western Queens Gazette article from August 8, 2004 states that Dan MacDougald was the one who started the Emotional Maturity Instruction course referred to by Metzger. According to Timms, Norman Malek-Yonan died in the 1970s. Apparently MacDougald had purchased the Khaboris codex from Yonan, and started a few organizations dealing with psychology in the 1970s. After the 1999 dating by the University of Arizona, the Khaboris Codexb transitioned into the hands of Dr. Michael Ryce at the Heartland institute. Ryce co-authored an updated version of the Emotional Maturity Instruction course with MacDougald called Laws of Living. This course continues to be taught, annually, by Ryce at Heartland, his teaching center in the Ozark Mountains of Southern Missouri.

The Heartland's website states on a page about the Khaboris Codexb, "Before Dan MacDougald passed away, he left the Khabourisb in the stewardship of the Western-Rite Syrian Orthodox Church, in order that the validation, documentation, conservation, translation, publication and exhibition could be completed. Work continues on these processes, as well as development of several related books." The manuscripts appears to have remained physically at the Heartland institute. A page titled "The Khabouris Manuscript Ceremony at Heartland" has several small images of a woman posing with the "b" codex. At some point during this time, someone there seems to have taken low-resolution digital photos of all 500 plus pages of the codex.

At some point around 2004 the codex was sent to New York have high-resolution photos taken by Eric Rivera, director of the Khabouris Institute, working at the Better Light Company, a digital imaging company. Their website has a description of Rivera's work and a few high-quality image samples. During this time the Khabouris Manuscriptb was on display for public view as an exhibit in the Queensborough Community College Art Gallery in Bayside, New York. This likely generated the Western Queens Gazette article referenced above. Rivera mentions working on the manuscript in 2005, after which it appears to have been stolen. The Heartland website states, "The Khabouris Manuscript(b) was removed from QCC (without our prior knowledge) and was taken to London for auction by Sotheby's back in June 2007. The sale was not completed at that time; however, we have lost track of where the actual Manuscript is now located." It appears to have been purchased by Arizona collector James Melikian.

On December 11, 2007 the Phoenix Art Museum hosted a display of old manuscripts, including the Khaboris Codexb. The article announcing the display described it as being part of the James Melikian collection. Melikian, a resident of Phoenix, is Armenian and has cultural interests in collecting ancient Oriental Christian artifacts. He talks about this in the January 12, 2008 edition of the Armenian Reporter. In the article, which covered the Phoenix Art show, the author describes Melikian showing the Khaboris Codexb to visitors in a private viewing. Presumably the Khaboris Codexb is still in the Melikian private gallery. Melikian states in his inventory listing that his copy is a different manuscript than the one owned by the Library of Congress.

A page from the codex

See also 
 Aramaic New Testament

References

External links 

 Complete Khaburis Codex
 Khabouris Codex
 Official Khabouris Codex transcription website
 Peshitta transcripts, scholarly articles, and discussion board

4th-century Christian texts
Peshitta manuscripts